Chor Hooi Yee (born 4 May 1979) is a Malaysian former badminton player. Chor was the women's doubles silver medalist at the 1998 Commonwealth Games in Kuala Lumpur partnered with Lim Pek Siah, also helped the team reach the final and clinch the silver medal. Teamed-up with Chew Choon Eng in the mixed doubles, they claimed the gold medal at the 1999 Southeast Asian Games in Brunei. She previously left the Badminton Association of Malaysia due to nagging injuries and her studies in 2001, and in 2004 she made a comeback to the national squad. Chor educated business in HELP University. She now works as an executive committee member of Cheras club.

Achievements

Commonwealth Games 
Women's doubles

Southeast Asian Games 
Mixed doubles

Asian Junior Championships 
Girls' doubles

BWF Grand Prix (1 title, 1 runner-up)
The BWF Grand Prix has two levels: Grand Prix and Grand Prix Gold. It is a series of badminton tournaments, sanctioned by Badminton World Federation (BWF) since 2007. The World Badminton Grand Prix sanctioned by International Badminton Federation (IBF) since 1983.

Women's doubles

BWF International Challenge/Series (4 titles, 7 runners-up) 
Women's doubles

Mixed doubles

 BWF International Challenge tournament
 BWF International Series tournament
 BWF Future Series tournament

References

External links
 

1979 births
Living people
Malaysian sportspeople of Chinese descent
Malaysian female badminton players
Badminton players at the 1998 Asian Games
Asian Games competitors for Malaysia
Badminton players at the 1998 Commonwealth Games
Commonwealth Games gold medallists for Malaysia
Commonwealth Games medallists in badminton
Competitors at the 1995 Southeast Asian Games
Competitors at the 1999 Southeast Asian Games
Southeast Asian Games gold medalists for Malaysia
Southeast Asian Games bronze medalists for Malaysia
Southeast Asian Games medalists in badminton
Medallists at the 1998 Commonwealth Games